Nesika Beach is census-designated place and unincorporated community in Curry County, Oregon, United States. As of the 2020 census it had a population of 432.

Nesika means "we", "us", or "our" in Chinook Jargon.

Demographics

Climate

Education
It is in the Central Curry School District, which operates two schools: Riley Creek Elementary School (K-8) and Gold Beach High School.

The entire county is in the Southwestern Oregon Community College district.

See also
Ophir Beach

References

Unincorporated communities in Curry County, Oregon
Census-designated places in Oregon
Census-designated places in Curry County, Oregon
Unincorporated communities in Oregon
Populated coastal places in Oregon
Oregon placenames of Native American origin